Di Loreto is a surname of Italian origin. Notable people with this surname include:

 Dante Di Loreto, American film and television producer 
 Marco Di Loreto (born 1974), Italian former footballer turned manager
 Teresa Di Loreto (born 1989), Italian long jumper 

Italian-language surnames